In cryptography, a scytale (also transliterated skytale,  skutálē "baton, cylinder", also  skútalon) is a tool used to perform a transposition cipher, consisting of a cylinder with a strip of parchment wound around it on which is written a message. The ancient Greeks, and the Spartans in particular, are said to have used this cipher to communicate during military campaigns.

The recipient uses a rod of the same diameter on which the parchment is wrapped to read the message.

To cryptanalyse it is not difficult.  Use a tapered cone. Wrap the strip around it. Somewhere plaintext will be visible. That is the diameter of the rods used.

Encrypting

Suppose the rod allows one to write four letters around in a circle and five letters down the side of it.
The plaintext could be: "I am hurt very badly help".

To encrypt, one simply writes across the leather:

_
       |   |   |   |   |   |  |
       | I | a | m | h | u |  |
     __| r | t | v | e | r |__|
    |  | y | b | a | d | l |
    |  | y | h | e | l | p |
    |  |   |   |   |   |   |
_

so the ciphertext becomes, "Iryyatbhmvaehedlurlp" after unwinding.

Decrypting

To decrypt, all one must do is wrap the leather strip around the rod and read across. 
The ciphertext is: "Iryyatbhmvaehedlurlp"
Every fifth letter will appear on the same line, so the plaintext (after re-insertion of spaces) becomes: "I am hurt very badly help".

History

From indirect evidence, the scytale was first mentioned by the Greek poet Archilochus, who lived in the 7th century BC. Other Greek and Roman writers during the following centuries also mentioned it, but it was not until Apollonius of Rhodes (middle of the 3rd century BC) that a clear indication of its use as a cryptographic device appeared. A description of how it operated is not known from before Plutarch (50–120 AD):

Due to difficulties in reconciling the description of Plutarch with the earlier accounts, and circumstantial evidence such as the cryptographic weakness of the device, several authors have suggested that the scytale was used for conveying messages in plaintext and that Plutarch's description is mythological.

Message authentication hypothesis
An alternative hypothesis is that the scytale was used for message authentication rather than encryption.  Only if the sender wrote the message around a scytale of the same diameter as the receiver's would the receiver be able to read it.  It would therefore be difficult for enemy spies to inject false messages into the communication between two commanders.

Nonetheless, any person intercepting a scytale message, and having heard about the method, could with little difficulty find out the rod size needed (a kind of brute force attack); once knowing that, it would be easy to supplant the sender and forge new messages.

See also
 Caesar cipher

References

Further reading



Classical ciphers
Encryption devices
Military history of Sparta